Rob Penders (born 31 December 1975) is a Dutch football coach and a former player who mainly played for NAC Breda during his career. He is the manager of FC Eindhoven. Penders was a defender who made his debut in professional football, being part of the RBC Roosendaal squad in the 1994–95 season. In the season 1999-2000 he joined NAC Breda. He played there for 10 seasons.

Coaching career
After retiring, Penders worked for NAC Breda as a youth coach. In October 2014, he was named as temporarily assistant manager for the first team. In the 2016-17 season, Penders was in charge of the club's reserve team in addition to assisting the first team. He left the club on 22 March 2019 where he was fired.

On 5 June 2019, he was appointed as U19 manager of ADO Den Haag for the upcoming season.

References

1975 births
Living people
Footballers from Zaanstad
Dutch footballers
Association football defenders
RBC Roosendaal players
NAC Breda players
Eredivisie players
Dutch football managers
FC Eindhoven managers
Eerste Divisie managers